Caloptilia aceris is a moth of the family Gracillariidae. It is known from China, Japan (Honshū, Hokkaidō), Korea and the Russian Far East.

The wingspan is 9.5–12 mm.

The larvae feed on Acer miyabei, Acer mono, Acer palmatum and Acer saccharum. They probably mine the leaves of their host plant.

References

aceris
Moths described in 1966
Moths of Asia